This is a list of notable bodyguards.

Former military

United Kingdom
 Duncan Falconer – author and security consultant
 Trevor Rees-Jones – former bodyguard for Dodi Al-Fayed
 Chris Ryan – author and security consultant

United States
 Mario A. Romain - Former Military Police Lieutenant in the United States Army (retired), former State Trooper Investigator/Sergeant for the New York State Police (retired.) A Executive Protection and Physical Security Subject Matter Expert. Head of Security for Tom Cruise. CEO at On Point Resources, Inc.

Former police and security agencies

Russia
 Viktor Zolotov – former FSO RF bodyguard, Commander-in-chief of the Internal Troops of the Ministry of Internal Affairs of the Russian Federation

Ukraine
Mykola Melnychenko – Former SBU officer

United Kingdom
 James Wallace Beaton – Former Royalty Protection Group officer
 Barry Mannakee – Former Royalty Protection Group officer
 Walter H. Thompson (1890–1978) – bodyguard of Winston Churchill (1921–1945)

United States
Clint Hill – former bodyguard for First Lady Jacqueline Kennedy during the Kennedy assassination in Dallas, 1963.
Timothy J. McCarthy – former bodyguard for Ronald Reagan.

Civilians

United Kingdom
Peter Miles - Former officer of the Metropolitan Police and UK Home Office. A Security and Intelligence Subject Matter Expert. Bodyguard for names such as Beyoncé, Jay-Z, Ariana Grande and world's highest profile celebrities. CEO at Broadstone Risks

Ireland
Fran Cosgrave – former bodyguard for Westlife

United States

Alexandre Fardellone –French professional executive diplomat celebrities protection in California, also known as certified firearms instructor and tactical shooter. Bodyguard for Travis Scott, Mukesh Ambani, Tyga, Kingsley Coman
Chris Boykin – bodyguard on the TV show Rob and Big
Michael Clarke Duncan – actor
Mr. T – actor
Brodus Clay – professional wrestler, best known for his time with WWE, bodyguard for Snoop Dogg
Shad Gaspard – professional wrestler, best known for his time with WWE
Sheamus – professional wrestler, best known for his time with WWE, bodyguard for U2 and Bono

Historic
 Satwant Singh and Beant Singh – Bodyguards who assassinated Indian Prime Minister Indira Gandhi.
 Sempronius Densus – bodyguard of Piso Licinianus, deputy Roman emperor
 Dian Wei – bodyguard of the warlord Cao Cao
 Porter Rockwell – bodyguard of Joseph Smith Jr.

References

 
Bodyguards